Marco Antonio Carmo Anjos, known as Marquinhos (born 23 October 1961) is a Brazilian football manager and former player. His son, Gabriel Anjos, is also a footballer.

Club career
Born in Rio de Janeiro, Anjos played with America (RJ), São Paulo, Goiânia, América (GO) and Fluminense de Feira in Brazil.

Next he moved to Europe, first by playing with Portuguese side Académico de Viseu F.C. in the Primeira Liga (Portuguese First League) and moving to Oliveira do Hospital after. After one season in Portugal, he moved to Belgium where he played for Cercle Brugge K.S.V.

Through a strong season in Belgium, Anjos had the opportunity to reach the elite of the European football, moving to Serbia (at that time still Yugoslavia) to represent Spartak Subotica. He was along Carlos Roberto Jatobá and Osvaldo Monteiro the second Brazilians to play in the Yugoslav First League (the first one had been Domingo Franulovic in 1957 with RNK Split). Anjos played for Spartak Subotica in the 1990–91 season. In the same season he left for HNK Rijeka, in the Yugoslav First League.

In 1998 he played with FC Jazz in Finish Veikkausliiga.

Coaching career 
After retiring, Anjos became coach, managing Portuguese clubs 1º de Dezembro and Castelo Forte Futebol Clube. In 2013, he joined the scouting department of Sporting Clube de Portugal.

International 
Anjos was selected to coach the Portugal team that took part in the 2014 Expo Unity World Cup, leading the team to the semi-finals. In the next season he took the position of Technical Director in Mumbai Rush Soccer Academy.

References

1961 births
Living people
Footballers from Rio de Janeiro (city)
Brazilian footballers
Brazilian expatriate footballers
Association football midfielders
Association football forwards
America Football Club (RJ) players
São Paulo FC players
Goiânia Esporte Clube players
América Futebol Clube (GO) players
Fluminense de Feira Futebol Clube players
Expatriate footballers in Portugal
FK Spartak Subotica players
Yugoslav First League players
Expatriate footballers in Yugoslavia
FC Jazz players
Veikkausliiga players
Expatriate footballers in Finland
Brazilian football managers
Association football defenders
F.C. Oliveira do Hospital players